Kolka may refer to:

Kolka parish, an administrative division in Latvia
Kolka, Latvia, a village in Kolka Parish
Cape Kolka, where the Baltic Sea and Gulf of Riga meet
Kolka Glacier, a glacier in North Ossetia, Russia, near Mount Kazbek
Kolka-Karmadon rock ice slide, a partial collapse of the Kolka Glacier

See also
Kolga (disambiguation)